Percy Thirkell (13 February 1900 – 16 January 1997) was an English footballer who played as a left back for Bolton Wanderers, Tranmere Rovers and Congleton Town. He made 184 appearances for Tranmere.

References

1900 births
1997 deaths
Footballers from South Shields
Association football fullbacks
English footballers
Bolton Wanderers F.C. players
Tranmere Rovers F.C. players
Congleton Town F.C. players
English Football League players